Native fuchsia is a common name for several plants and may refer to:

 Correa reflexa, endemic to Australia
 Epacris longiflora, endemic to Eastern Australia
 Eremophila maculata, endemic to Australia
 Grevillea wilsonii, endemic to Western Australia

Grevillea taxa by common name